Bacillus amyloliquefaciens is a species of bacterium in the genus Bacillus that is the source of the BamHI restriction enzyme. It also synthesizes a natural antibiotic protein barnase, a widely studied ribonuclease that forms a famously tight complex with its intracellular inhibitor barstar, and plantazolicin, an antibiotic with selective activity against Bacillus anthracis.

It is used in agriculture, aquaculture, and hydroponics to fight root pathogens such as Ralstonia solanacearum, Pythium, Rhizoctonia solani,  Alternaria tenuissima and Fusarium as well improve root tolerance to salt stress. They are considered a growth-promoting rhizobacteria and have the ability to quickly colonize roots.

Discovery and name
Bacillus amyloliquefaciens was discovered in soil 1943 by a Japanese scientist named Fukumoto, who gave the bacterium its name because it produced (faciens) a liquifying (lique) amylase (amylo).

Uses
Alpha amylase from B. amyloliquefaciens is often used in starch hydrolysis. It is also a source of subtilisin, which catalyzes the breakdown of proteins in a similar way to trypsin.

Agriculture 
Bacillus amyloliquefaciens is considered a root-colonizing biocontrol bacterium, and is used to fight some plant root pathogens in agriculture, aquaculture, and hydroponics. It has been shown to provide benefits to plants in both soil and hydroponic applications. It takes action against bacterial and fungi pathogens, and may prevent infection though competitive exclusion or out-competing the unwanted pathogen. It has been shown to be effective against several root pathogens that hurt agricultural yields in soil and hydroponics, such as Ralstonia solanacearum in cannabis sativa-hemp, tomatoes, Rhizoctonia solani in lettuce, Pythium in cannabis sativa-hemp & tomatoes, Alternaria tenuissima in English ivy and Fusarium in bananas and cucumbers. It also appears to improve root tolerance against abiotic stress, allowing plants such as maize to tolerate high salt concentrations in hydroponic applications, while also reducing salt concentrations in the plant tissue.

Status as a species
Between the 1940s and the 1980s, bacteriologists debated as to whether or not B. amyloliquefaciens was a separate species or a subspecies of Bacillus subtilis. The matter was settled in 1987; it was established to be a separate species.

In the American Type Culture Collection, the number for B. amyloliquefaciens is 23350.

Bacillus amyloliquefaciens FZB42, the producer of the ultranarrow-spectrum antibiotic plantazolicin, was reclassified in 2015 as B. velezensis NRRL B-41580T (along with B. methylotrophicus KACC 13015 T and  B. oryzicola KACC 18228) based on phenotype and genotype coherence.

References

External links
Type strain of Bacillus amyloliquefaciens at BacDive -  the Bacterial Diversity Metadatabase

amyloliquefaciens
Bacteria described in 1987
Biological pest control